Yemen maintains a Yemeni list of most wanted suspected terrorists. 
On March 30, 2009, Yemen added "38  wanted Al Qaeda-linked militants", bring the number of individuals on the list to 154.
The list includes 85 individuals who are also listed on the Saudi list of most wanted suspected terrorists.

References

Terrorism in Yemen
Most wanted lists
Terrorism-related lists
Most wanted suspected terrorists